Alto de la Sierra is a village and rural municipality in Salta Province within the Rivadavia department in northwestern Argentina. Much of the population is aboriginal, engaged mainly in small-scale farming.

Location
Alto de la Sierra is located over 50 km southeast of the town of Santa Victoria Este, through a path that connects to the Formosan town of General Mosconi.

Population
Alto de la Sierra had 781 inhabitants (INDEC, 2001). In the previous census of 1991, the area was listed as a dispersed rural population.

References

Populated places in Salta Province